James Augustus Fox (August 11, 1827September 1901) was an American lawyer, soldier, and statesman.

Personal life
Born in the Massachusetts capital city Boston on August 11, 1827, James Augustus Fox was descended from English and Scottish people.  His father—George Howe Fox—came from the line of the author John Foxe, while his mother—Emily Fox—was related to the statesman John Murray Forbes.  Fox attended Boston Public Schools and Harvard Law School before clerking for John C. Park.

Fox and Julia Elizabeth (of Providence, Rhode Island) were married in 1848.  The couple had three daughters—Henrietta, Julia, and Lillian—before Julia Elizabeth died in 1872.  That same year, Fox moved to Cambridge, Massachusetts.  He died in September 1901, and was buried in Mount Auburn Cemetery.

Career
As a lawyer, Fox was admitted to the Suffolk County, Massachusetts bar in 1854.  Throughout the years, Fox was an active member of the Independent Order of Odd Fellows, the Improved Order of Red Men, and the Knights of Pythias (as "Grand Chancellor of Massachusetts, Supreme Representative to the national branch, and Judge-Advocate-General of the uniform rank").

Military
During the American Civil War, Fox was made a captain in the 13th Regiment of the Unattached Companies Massachusetts Volunteer Militia in 1861.  From 1861–1862, Fox served in Virginia with good marks, and from 1864–1865 he commanded the Ancient and Honorable Artillery Company of Massachusetts.  As an early member of the Loyal Legion after the war, Fox occasionally made speeches on the conflict, including his "The Two Civilizations" which was later published.

Civil service
Fox was a member of the Boston School Committee for three years.  From 1867–1868, he served in the Massachusetts House of Representatives, and in the Senate from 1870–1871.  After moving there in 1874, Fox served four terms as the mayor of Cambridge, Massachusetts.

See also

 1868 Massachusetts legislature
 1870 Massachusetts legislature
 1871 Massachusetts legislature

References

1827 births
1901 deaths
19th-century American politicians
American Civil War officers
Ancient and Honorable Artillery Company of Massachusetts
Harvard Law School alumni
Lawyers from Boston
Lawyers from Cambridge, Massachusetts
Massachusetts state senators
Mayors of Cambridge, Massachusetts
Members of the Massachusetts House of Representatives
People of Massachusetts in the American Civil War